Kubo or KUBO may refer to:
 Kubo (surname)
 Kubo gap, the average spacing between consecutive energy levels
 , the ruler of the Kantō region during the early Muromachi period in Japan
 Lit Kubo, a proposed electric cargo scooter
 KUBO, a radio station in Calexico, California, U.S.
 Takefusa Kubo (born 2000), a Japanese footballer
 Tite Kubo, a Japanese manga author and artist best known for Bleach

See also
 Suō-Kubo Station, on the Gantoku Line in Kudamatsu, Yamaguchi, Japan
 Bahay Kubo: A Pinoy Mano Po!, a Tagalog-language movie 
 Green–Kubo relations, a mathematical expression, named for Ryogo Kubo
 Kubo and the Two Strings, a 2016 stop-motion animated film from Laika Entertainment
 Kubo Won't Let Me Be Invisible, a 2019 manga and 2023 anime